Robert Trent "Bobby" Jones Jr. (born July 24, 1939) is an American golf course architect.  He is the son of golf course designer Robert Trent Jones and the brother of golf course designer Rees Jones.

Background
Jones was born in Montclair, New Jersey and graduated from Montclair High School in 1957. After attending Yale and graduate studies at Stanford University, he joined his father's firm, Robert Trent Jones Incorporated. He rose to become vice-president of the company and assumed control of west coast operations in 1962.

In the 1960s, he began designing courses on his own and formed his own company in the early 1970s in Palo Alto, California. He has since designed or remodeled more than 250 golf courses during his career.

Jones continues to design courses and currently resides in Woodside, California. He has also served as the president of the American Society of Golf Course Architects, former Chairman of the California State Park and Recreation Commission and has published a book entitled Golf by Design designed to help players understand golf course layout.

Courses designed

With Robert Trent Jones Incorporated
 Willow Lakes Golf Course, Nebraska (1964)
 Silverado-South, Northern California (1967)
 Eugene Country Club, Oregon (1968) 
 Karuizawa Golf, Japan (1972)

With Robert Trent Jones II Company
 Adobe Creek Petaluma, California (1989)
 Alcanada Golf (18 holes) 2013, Mallorca, Balearic Islands, Spain (2003)
 Arizona National Golf Club (Tucson, Arizona) (1996) 
 Arrowhead, Colorado (1974)
 Ayala Greenfield Estates, Laguna, Philippines (2000)
 Bjaavann Golfklubb,  Kristiansand, Norway (2005)
 Bro Hof Slott Golf Club, Stockholm, Sweden (2007)
 Brookside Country Club, Stockton, California (1991) 
 Chambers Bay, University Place, Washington (2007) 
 Charter Oak Country Club, Hudson, Massachusetts (2001)
 Cochiti Lake, New Mexico (1980)
 CordeValle Golf Club, San Martin, California (1996)
 Coto de Caza North, Coto de Caza, California (1987) 
 Coto de Caza South, Coto de Caza, California (1995) 
 Cragun's Legacy Courses (Bobby's Legacy, Dutch Legacy and Reversible 9) Brainerd, Minnesota (1998, 2000, 2002) 
 Crystal Tree Country Club, Orland Park, Illinois (1989) 
 Damai Indah Golf Pantai Indah Kapuk Course, Jakarta, Indonesia (1992)
 Deer Creek, Overland Park, Kansas  (1989)
 Desert Dunes Golf Club, Desert Hot Springs, California (1988)
 Eagle Point Golf Club, Medford, Oregon (1995)
 Edinburgh USA Golf Club, Brooklyn Park, Minnesota (1987)
 Estrella del Mar at Mazatlan, México, (1996)
 Fairmont Chateau Whistler Golf Club, Whistler, Canada (1993)  
 Glencoe Golf & Country Club, Calgary, Alberta (Glen Forest and Glen Meadows courses) (1983–85)
 Golf & Country Club de Bossey, Bossey, Haute-Savoie, France (1985) 
 Golf Club Castelconturbia, Agrate Conturbia, Italy (1989)
 Golf de Bondues, the back nine, Bondues, France (1990)
 Greenhorn Creek, Angels Camp, California (1996) 
 Heron Lakes Golf Club, Portland, Oregon (1968, 1992)
 Highland Springs Country Club, Springfield, Missouri (1989)
 Hoiana Shores Golf Club, Hoi An, Vietnam (2020)
 Holtsmark Golfclub, Sylling, Norway (2006)
 Jefferson County Club, Blacklick, Ohio (1992)
 Joondalup, Western Australia (1985)
 Kaluhyat Golf Club, Verona, New York (2003)
 Keystone Ranch, Colorado (1980)
 Lake Shastina Golf Resort, Weed, California (1973)
 Las Sendas Country Club, Mesa, Arizona (1995)
 Lansdowne Resort, The Jones Course, Leesburg, Virginia (1991)
 le Golf du Chateau de la Chouette, Gaillon-Sur-Montcient, France (1998)
 Le Triomphe Golf and Country Club, Brousard, Louisiana (1986)
 Links at Spanish Bay, Pebble Beach, California (1987)
 Long Island National Golf Course, Riverhead, New York (1999)
 Lübker Golf Resort (27 holes), Nimtofte, Denmark (2008)
 Marshes Golf Club, Ottawa, Ontario (2002)
 Mesa de Yeguas Country Club, Anapoima, Colombia (2010)
 Miklagard Golf Club, Oslo, Norway (2002)
 Moscow Country Club, Krasnogorsk, Greater Moscow, Russia (1994)
 Palma Real, Ixtapa Zihuatanejo, Mexico (1975) 
 Penha Longa Resort Sintra, Portugal (1992)
 Osprey Meadows at Tamarack Resort, Donnelly, Idaho (2006)
 Pok-Ta-Pok, Cancun, Mexico (1976)
 Poppy Hills, Monterey, California (1986)
 Pondok Indah Golf Course, Pondok Indah, Jakarta, Indonesia (1976)
 Prairie Landing West Chicago, Illinois (1995)
 Prairie View Golf Course, Carmel, Indiana
 President Country Club, West Palm Beach, Florida
 Princeville Makai Golf Club (1971) & Princeville Prince Course (1991) Kauai, Hawaii
 Pueblo de Oro Golf and Country Club, Cagayan de Oro, Philippines (1998)
 Pulai Springs Resort Berhad, Johor, Malaysia
 Raffles Country Club, Singapore
 Rainbow Hills Golf Club, South Korea
 Rancho San Marcos, Santa Barbara, California
 Rancho La Quinta, La Quinta, California (1993) 
 Raven at Sabino Springs, Tucson, Arizona (1995)
 Reef Club, Grand Bahama Island (2000)
 The Ridge, Auburn, California (1999)
 Rock Barn Golf & Spa, Hickory, North Carolina (2002)
 Rollingstone Ranch Golf Club, Steamboat Springs, Colorado (1974)
 Royal Golf Club La Bagnaia Siena, Tuscany
 Royal Springs Golf Course, Srinagar, Jammu and Kashmir, India (2001)
 Royal Westmoreland, Barbados (1992)
 Ruuhikoski Golf, Seinäjoki, Finland (1992)
 SentryWorld, Stevens Point, WI (1982)
 Sequoyah National Golf Club, Whittier, North Carolina (2009)
 Serrano Country Club, El Dorado Hills, California (1996)
 Silverado Country Club, Napa, California (1966)
 Skjoldenaesholm Golfklub, Trent Jones Jr. Course, Jystrup, Denmark (2006)
 Southern Highlands Golf Club, Las Vegas, Nevada (1999) (with his father)
 Sugarloaf, Carrabassett Valley, Maine (1986)
 Sunday River Golf Club, Newry, Maine (2005)
 Sunriver-North (Woodlands), Sunriver, Oregon (1982)
 Termas de Río Hondo Golf Club, Termas de Río Hondo, Santiago del Estero, Argentina (2018)
 The Blessings golf course, Fayetteville, Arkansas (2004)
 The Club at Weston Hills, Weston, Florida (1993)
 The Links at Bodega Harbour Bodega Bay, CA, 1978
 The Mines Resort & Golf Club, Kuala Lumpur, Malaysia (1994)
 The National, Melbourne, Australia (1988)
 The Orchards, Detroit, Michigan (1993)
 The Prince Golf Course, Kauai, Hawaii (1990)
 The Scandinavian Golf Club (36 holes), Farum, Denmark (2010)
 The Wisley, Surrey, England (1991)
 ThunderHawk Golf Club, Beach Park, Illinois (1999)
 Tierra Del Sol Golf Course, Aruba (1995)
 Three Crowns Golf Club, Casper, Wyoming (2005)
 Ute Creek Golf Course, Longmont, Colorado (1997)
 Waikoloa Village, Hawaii (1981)
 Windsor Polo Club, Vero Beach, Florida (1990)
 Woodmont Golf and Country Club Canton, Georgia (1999)
 University Ridge Golf Course, Verona and Madison, Wisconsin (1991)
 Wedgewood Golf and Country Club, Powell, Ohio (1991)
 Zala Springs Golf Resort Zalacsány, Hungary (2016)

References

External links
Jones' company site
American Society of Golf Course Architects profile

Golf course architects
Montclair High School (New Jersey) alumni
People from Montclair, New Jersey
Yale University alumni
Stanford University alumni
1939 births
Living people
People from Woodside, California